Con Todos Mis Sentidos (Eng.: "With All My Senses") is the title of a studio album released by Spanish singer-songwriter Braulio in 1988. This album became his second number-one set on the Billboard Latin Pop Albums. The album produced six singles, three of which reached the top five on Hot Latin Tracks: "Con Las Manos en la Mesa", "El Vicio de tu Boca", "Un Tiempo Para Los Nosotros", "Una Mujer Como Tu" and "Cuando Se Acaba La Magia". The album was nominated for Pop Album of the Year at the 1st Lo Nuestro Music Awards.

Track listing

Chart performance

References

1988 albums
Braulio García albums
Sony Discos albums